The Van Cliburn International Piano Competition (The Cliburn) is an American piano competition by The Cliburn, first held in 1962 in Fort Worth, Texas and hosted by the Van Cliburn Foundation.  Initially held at Texas Christian University, the competition has been held at the Bass Performance Hall since 2001.  The competition is named in honour of Van Cliburn, who won the first International Tchaikovsky Competition, in 1958.

The Van Cliburn Competition is held once every four years, in the year of United States presidential inaugurations. The winners and runners-up receive substantial cash prizes, plus concert tours at world-famous venues where they are able to perform pieces of their choice.  While Cliburn was alive, he did not serve as a judge in the competition, provide financial support, or work in its operations.  However, he attended performances by competitors regularly and greeted them afterwards on occasion.

Contestants draw lots for their performing place in the competition.  The competition began on-line audio streaming of the performances in 1997.  In 2009, the competition webcast all of the performances live for the first time in its history.

Medalists

Amateur and Junior competitions 
In 1999, the competition added an amateur edition, which allows high-performing pianists aged 35 or above to participate, provided that they do not earn their main source of income through piano pedagogy or performance. Amateur competitions have been held in 2000, 2002, 2004, 2007, 2011, and 2016. Originally, the 2016 Amateur Competition was to be held in 2015, but was canceled, due to the inauguration of a junior version of the Cliburn Competition, which attracts top-performing teenage piano students from around the globe. Like the regular Cliburn Competition, the amateur and junior competitions consist of solo rounds, followed by concerto performances with the Fort Worth Symphony Orchestra in the finals.

See also
 Van Cliburn Foundation
 List of classical music competitions
 World Federation of International Music Competitions

Notes

References

External links
 The Van Cliburn Foundation – History and information on the competition.
 Directory of International Piano Competitions
 Piano Competitions & Music Competitions at Bakitone International

 
Culture of Fort Worth, Texas
Texas classical music
Economy of Fort Worth, Texas
Piano competitions in the United States
Piano competitions